Saint Vitus is the debut album by the American doom metal band Saint Vitus, released Friday the 13th of January 1984 via SST Records. According to Dave Chandler, the album was recorded in 1982, but was delayed by nearly two years, due to a lawsuit that SST was involved in. It was released on both vinyl and cassette, and later on CD; all three formats are currently difficult to find. "White Magic/Black Magic" and "Saint Vitus" are included on the compilation album Heavier Than Thou. Along with Trouble's Psalm 9, Saint Vitus is considered by many critics one of the first doom metal albums to be released.

"Burial at Sea" was later recorded by Goatsnake and released on their Trampled Under Hoof EP.

Track listing
All songs written by Dave Chandler, except where noted.

Personnel 

Saint Vitus
 Scott Reagers – vocals
 Dave Chandler – guitar, backing vocals
 Mark Adams – bass guitar, backing vocals
 Armando Acosta – drums, backing vocals

Additional musicians
 Merrill Ward, Scott Reagers, Yvonne Saxton – backing vocals

Production
 Dez Cadena – producer, backing vocals
 Joe Carducci – producer
 SPOT  – producer, engineer

References

1984 debut albums
Saint Vitus (band) albums
SST Records albums
Albums produced by Spot (producer)